WJ Steenkamp is a South African rugby union player for the  in the Currie Cup. His regular position is flanker.

He made his debut in the same fixture, starting the match at flanker.

Honours
 Currie Cup winner 2021
 United Rugby Championship runner-up 2021-22

References

South African rugby union players
Living people
Rugby union flankers
Blue Bulls players
2000 births
Bulls (rugby union) players